D.N. De Homoeopathic Medical College & Hospital is a government homoeopathic medical college and hospital in Kolkata, West Bengal, India. It was established in 1927 and one of the oldest homeopathic medical colleges in India. The college is affiliated with the West Bengal University of Health Sciences. It is also recognized by the Central Council of Homoeopathy (CCH). It offers B.H.M.S. (Bachelor in Homoeopathic Medicine & Surgery) and M.D. (Homoeopathy) courses. This college was established as Dunham College of Homoeopathy in 1927, and later renamed as D.N. De Homoeopathic Medical College in the name of its founder Dr. D. N. De. in the January’ 1951.

See also

References

External links
Official website

1927 establishments in British India
Educational institutions established in 1927
Homeopathic hospitals
Hospitals established in 1927
Hospitals in West Bengal
Universities and colleges in Kolkata
Homoeopathic Medical Colleges in West Bengal
Affiliates of West Bengal University of Health Sciences